The Cherubim and Seraphim Society is a Christian denomination from Nigeria. It was founded by Christiana Abiodun Emanuel as a split from the Eternal Sacred Order of Cherubim and Seraphim. The society is one of the Aladura churches. It has been claimed that the Cherubim and Seraphim Society is a case of syncretism between Christianity and African traditional religion.

Its headquarters is in Lagos, Nigeria. In Lagos, it has Holy Mary Cathedral Church (Lagos), built in 1951. It is present in Northern Nigeria, too. Other countries where it is present include Senegal, the United Kingdom and the United States. Angels, in particular the Archangel Michael, are central to the society.

See also 
 Nigerian sectarian violence
 Cherubim and Seraphim (Nigerian church)
 Eternal Sacred Order of Cherubim and Seraphim

References 

African initiated churches
Christian denominations in Nigeria
Religious organizations based in Lagos